Steve Hamilton is a mystery writer who is known for the Alex McKnight series. Apart from his Alex McKnight books, Hamilton has written Night Work and The Lock Artist. His works have won the Edgar Award, Shamus Award and Barry Award.

Books
His first book, A Cold Day in Paradise, won the Private Eye Writers of America/St. Martin's Press Award for best first mystery by an unpublished writer, the Mystery Writers of America Edgar Award for best first novel, and the Private Eye Writers of America Shamus Award for best first novel, the only first novel to win the latter two awards.  That book introduced Alex McKnight, an ex-cop who rents out cabins in the small town of Paradise in Michigan's isolated Upper Peninsula for a living and becomes a reluctant private detective.

Hamilton's second Alex McKnight novel, Winter of the Wolf Moon (2000), was named one of the year's Notable Books by The New York Times Book Review and received a starred review from Publishers Weekly, as did his next three novels: The Hunting Wind, North of Nowhere and Blood Is the Sky (which won the 2004 Gumshoe Award).  To date, ten books and one short story in the Alex McKnight series have been published  and they have been translated into 12 languages.

Night Work is a stand-alone novel featuring a probation officer in upstate New York. Night Work was nominated for the Crime Writers' Association top award, The Duncan Lawrie Dagger. In 2006, Hamilton also won the Michigan Author Award for his body of work. Hamilton anticipates more McKnight titles in the future.

His standalone novel The Lock Artist won an Edgar Award for best novel, a CWA Steel Dagger for best thriller in the UK, and an Alex Award from the American Library Association, which recognizes books that successfully cross over from the adult market and appeal to young adult readers.  The Lock Artist has been translated into seventeen different languages, including Japanese, where it was voted the number-one translated crime novel of 2012 by both the annual Kono Mystery Ga Sugoi guide and by Weekly Bunshun magazine.

His 2016 novel, The Second Life of Nick Mason, debuted on the New York Times bestseller list in both Hardcover Fiction and Combined Print and E-Book Fiction, and also appeared on the Publishers Weekly, USA Today, Los Angeles Times, and National Independent bestseller lists.  It was also selected as one of five finalists for the prestigious Hammett Prize for literary excellence in crime fiction, and was nominated for a Barry Award for Best Novel of the Year.

Personal
Hamilton is married and has two kids. They live in New York. He wrote his first twelve books while working for IBM, writing at night after his family had gone to bed.

Awards
A Cold Day in Paradise (1998)
1997 St. Martin's Press/Private Eye Writers of America Best First P.I. Novel by unpublished writer
1999 MWA Edgar Allan Poe for Best First
1999 PWA Shamus for Best First
1999 Finalist for Anthony Best First
1999 Finalist for Barry Best First

Winter of the Wolf Moon (2000)
2001 Finalist Barry for Best Novel
2000 New York Times Notable Book List

North of Nowhere (2003)
2003 Finalist Shamus for Best Novel
2003 Finalist Anthony for Best Mystery
2003 Finalist Barry for Best Novel

Blood is the Sky (2004)
2004 Finalist Shamus for Best Novel
2004 Finalist Anthony for Best Mystery
2004 Gumshoe Award

A Stolen Season (2006)
2007 Finalist Nero

Night Work (2007)
2008 Finalist Gold Dagger (Duncan Lawrie Dagger)

The Lock Artist (2010)
2011 Edgar for Best Novel
2011 Barry for Best Novel
2011 Ian Fleming Steel Dagger Award
2011 Alex Award
2011 Finalist Anthony for Best Mystery
2011 Finalist Gold Dagger (Duncan Lawrie Dagger)
2010 Finalist Dilys Award
2013 The Best Translated Mystery of the Year in Japan (2013 Kono Mystery ga Sugoi!)

The Second Life of Nick Mason (2016)
2017 Finalist Dashiell Hammett Award
2017 Finalist, Barry for Best Novel

Bibliography

Alex McKnight Series 
A Cold Day in Paradise (1998)
Winter of the Wolf Moon (2000)
The Hunting Wind (2002)
North of Nowhere (2003)
Blood is the Sky (2004)
Ice Run (2005)
A Stolen Season (2006)
Beneath the Book Tower: An Alex McKnight Short Story (2011)
Misery Bay (2011)
Die a Stranger (2012)
Let It Burn (2013)
Dead Man Running (2018)
Riddle Island (Short Story) (2020)

Nick Mason Series 

 The Second Life of Nick Mason (2016)
 Exit Strategy (2017)
 An Honorable Assassin (coming)

Other 
Night Work (2007)
The Lock Artist (2010)
The Bounty (with Janet Evanovich) (2021)

References

20th-century American novelists
21st-century American novelists
American male novelists
American mystery writers
University of Michigan alumni
Writers from Detroit
1961 births
Living people
IBM employees
Edgar Award winners
20th-century American male writers
21st-century American male writers
Novelists from Michigan
Barry Award winners